The following is the official canvassing of votes by the Congress of the Philippines for the 2010 Philippine presidential and vice presidential election. The canvassing, originally scheduled to start on May 31, started on May 25, 2010, and ended on June 9, 2010. The Congress is mandated to declare a winner 30 days after the elections (June 9).

Process
After voters had finished voting, the counting machines will then count the votes received by each candidate in each position. For positions elected on a national basis (president, vice president, senators and party-list representatives), the counting machine will then print an election return for that precinct, and will transmit the results to the municipal/city board of canvassers, Congress, Commission on Elections, the citizen's arm authorized by the commission, political parties, and others.

The city or municipality will then tally the votes for all positions and will issue two documents at its conclusion: a statement of votes where the votes obtained by candidates in each precinct in a city/municipality is stated; and a certificate of canvass (COC), a document in electronic and printed form containing the total votes in figures obtained by each candidate in the city or municipality. The city or municipal COC will either be sent electronically to Congress (if the city is an Independent city with its own legislative district) or to the provincial board of canvassers in which the process is repeated; this time the provincial COC will be sent to Congress.

Congress, sitting as the National Board of Canvassers, will canvass the votes to determine who among the candidates are elected president and vice president.

In theory, all of the votes from the election returns when added must be equal to the votes canvassed by Congress coming from the city/provincial COCs.

Members of the canvassing committee
Instead of the whole Congress canvassing the votes, a committee comprised evenly between the Senate and the House of Representatives will canvass the votes at the Batasang Pambansa Complex in Quezon City, the home of the House of Representatives. The Senate President and the Speaker will co-chair the proceedings; previously, the majority leaders of both houses played this role. House Speaker Prospero Nograles announced the composition of the House delegation on May 21, as Senate Majority Floor Leader Juan Miguel Zubiri announced theirs on May 24.

Members of Congress who ran for president (Noynoy Aquino, Richard Gordon, Jamby Madrigal, and Manny Villar) and vice president (Loren Legarda and Mar Roxas) are banned from attending the proceedings. Senators Miriam Defensor Santiago and Francis Escudero recused themselves for actively supporting candidates for president and vice president (Defensor Santiago herself was a guest senatorial candidate of four parties), while Estrada, who also recused himself, will only sit to provide quorum.

Each political party is entitled to two lawyers who may file motions before Congress.

Proceedings

May 25–28
On May 25, while the Senate approved the rules governing the proceedings quickly, House members took an hour to approve the rules. Joel Villanueva of CIBAC party-list predicted that once the certificates of canvass from the incumbent Congressman was defeated will be checked, "expect these defeated lawmakers to raise hell." Speaker Nograles, himself beaten in the Davao City mayoralty election (he is term-limited to run for congressman this election), assured that the new president and vice president will be proclaimed simultaneously. Congress adjourned after approval of the rules and will reconvene on the afternoon of May 26.

On May 26, all Commission on Elections commissioners, Smartmatic executives and information technology experts where present before the joint canvassing committee. The Congressmen asked the commissioners on the matter of "two" separate certificates of canvass (COC) for the positions of president and vice president. Dilangalen remarked that in the 2004 election, there was only one COC for both positions; Commissioner Larrazabal replied that each COC, although printed in several pages, is one document, with Chairman Jose Melo adding that there is a separate COC per position per province. Arthur Defensor asked if this meant Congress should canvass the COCs separately, with Nograles replying that will be up for the canvassing committee to decide that. Other issues tackled the lack of digital signatures in the election returns, and the erroneous number of registered voters in the Smartmatic database ("256, 733, 195") when Enrile opened the server. Smartmatic president for Asia-Pacific Cesar Flores replied to Enrile that the erroneous figure was an error in the application "that was adding the number of registered voters from the PCOS [machines] from the precinct level and it was adding the number of registered voters from the municipal level…and from the province…Therefore, multiplying the number of registered voters", and that only voter turnout and not the results for all positions will be affected.

After starting 55 minutes late, representative Didagen Dilangalen questioned the authenticity of the automated elections and opposed moves to open the ballot boxes containing machine-generated COCs. Enrile sought a compromise by proposing the creation of a technical working group that will hold a separate inquiry in the legitimacy of the automated election results. Dilangalen left the plenary after Zubiri made the motion to open the COCs from overseas absentee voting (OAV). After and six hours of joint session, canvassing for manually counted COCs were begun with OAVs from Laos being the first COC canvassed. Aquino and Roxas led after the first day that the COCs were canvassed. COCs from Guam, Brunei, Papua New Guinea and Thailand were the other COCs canvassed before Congress adjourned for the day.

By the end of the week, the joint committee was avail to canvass 131 COCs, except for two: one COC from the Bahamas had irregularities and was deferred, while the COC from Iran was found to be empty. As well, 26 countries and territories recorded zero votes for all positions namely: Guyana, Barbados, Costa Rica, El Salvador, Guatemala, Honduras, Panama, Antigua and Barbuda, Cayman Islands, Saint Kitts and Nevis, Turks and Caicos Islands, Mozambique, Namibia, Swaziland, Zambia, Zimbabwe, Nepal, Dominican Republic, Madagascar, Malawi, Mauritius, Tanzania, and Iran (as stated before). This led to Senator Aquilino Pimentel, Jr. to question the COMELEC on the reason for the dismal result of overseas Filipinos failing to vote.

May 31–June 4
The main crux of contention during the canvassing for the COCs transmitted electronically was the issue of null votes, i.e. overvotes, undervotes, abstentions, and votes were not tallied in CoCs because of incomplete transmission. The Aquino-Roxas Bantay Balota (ARBB, "Aquino-Roxas ballot watch") said that 3 million votes were considered null votes, and 10-15% of votes from Roxas' strongholds in Western Visayas and Central Visayas were wasted. In addition, according to them, if to 50-60% of the votes were for Roxas, he would've lost 250,000-300,000 votes. ARBB did not question null votes for the presidential election, where Aquino is leading. The commission, however, said that the nullified votes are the equivalent of "stray votes" before automation, and that rules on stray or null votes would apply even if votes were manually counted in an electoral protest, chairman Jose Melo said.

Other frequent objections by lawyers representing the candidates were the lowering of thresholds of votes canvassed locally, which were then transmitted to the commission's servers, and mismatching figures in the electronic and manual COCs.

At the end of the week, only five COCs are left to be canvassed. COCs from Davao City, Bacolod, Mountain Province, Eastern Samar and Lanao del Sur, in which some municipalities held rescheduled elections on June 4. Session will resume on June 7.

June 7–9

With only five COCs left on June 7 waiting to be canvassed, the Roxas camp was insisting on having a manual audit on all null votes. Congress, saying that it not within their rules to count the null votes, disallowed the motions and proceeded to canvass the four COCs in their possession – the COC from Lanao del Sur had not been delivered. This after 28 clustered precincts in the province failed to hold elections on June 3, the date of their rescheduled elections. As a result, with all but COC canvassed, Aquino and Binay had unassailable leads.

On June 8, the Lanao del Sur COC was canvassed. In some precincts, Roxas had one or zero votes, and that there was 96% voter turnout in the province, revelations from Roxas' lawyer that representative Roilo Golez found to be "incredible . . . statistically improbable." The COC was still canvassed and Aquino and Binay will be proclaimed as president-elect and vice president-elect respectively, on June 9.

On June 9, in a joint public session, Congress proclaimed Aquino as the president-elect, and Binay as the vice president-elect amidst a chorus of cheers from the gallery  After the joint session was opened, Senate President pro tempore Jinggoy Estrada read his father's concession speech. The majority leaders of both Houses, Juan Miguel Zubiri and Arthur Defensor, Sr. both delivered their endorsement speeches supporting adopting the results of the canvass. Senate minority Aquilino Pimentel endorsed the resolution, and branded the acronym "PCOS" as "President Cory's Only Son", referring to Senator Aquino. The House deputy leaders Neptali Gonzales II and Roilo Golez also delivered speeches endorsing the resolution. Zuburi motioned that the resolution be passed, and was passed with no objection; Defensor also did the same for the House and was adopted without objections. The Senate President and House Speaker motioned to the majority leaders of both houses to accompany the president-elect and vice-president-elect to the session hall. With the resumption the session, Binay was first ushered on to the rostrum where Enrile and Nograles raised his hands; Aquino was then led to the rostrum where Nograles and Enrile, the man who had jailed his father Ninoy Aquino, raised his hand in victory.

The joint session for the canvassing and proclamation ended in a record time of eight days. Aquino then held his first press conference as president-elect.

Presidential election
Based on the official canvass of the Congress of the Philippines

*disqualified from running but is included in the ballot; all votes cast for him are spoiled.

Vice presidential election

References

2010 Philippine presidential election